The Minister of Economic Warfare was a British government position which existed during the Second World War. The minister was in charge of the Special Operations Executive and the Ministry of Economic Warfare.

See also
 Blockade of Germany (1939–45)

Ministers of Economic Warfare 1939–1945

 Ronald Cross (3 September 1939 – 15 May 1940)
 Hugh Dalton (15 May 1940 – 22 February 1942)
 Roundell Palmer, 3rd Earl of Selborne (22 February 1942 – 23 May 1945)

Director-General, Ministry of Economic Warfare
 Sir Frederick W. Leith-Ross 1939–1942 
 The Earl of Drogheda 1942–1945

References

Economic Warfare
Defunct ministerial offices in the United Kingdom